"Off the Grid" is a song by American rapper Kanye West from his tenth studio album Donda (2021). The song features vocals from American rappers Playboi Carti and Fivio Foreign. It was released to US urban contemporary radio stations as the album's fourth single on November 30, 2021 (third promoted to radio formats).

Background and recording

On July 18, 2020, West announced Donda on his Twitter and posted a track listing that had "Off the Grid" on it. In December, it was revealed that West was recording and executive producing for Playboi Carti's album Whole Lotta Red, which released on December 25. Playboi Carti recorded his verse for "Off the Grid" during these sessions. A snippet of Playboi Carti's part leaked after West played the song on his speakers during his stay at a hotel in Belgium in December. The collaboration with Fivio Foreign came together after West asked Fivio Foreign to come to Mercedes Benz Stadium on the night before the August 5 listening party. Talking about the collaboration, Fivio Foreign recalled:

The song was first officially previewed at the August 5 listening party at Mercedes Benz Stadium. It was previewed again in Soldier Field on August 26, with an added verse from West at the end.

Reception

The track was named the best song of 2021 by Complex.

Credits and personnel
Credits adapted from Tidal.

 Kanye West – production, vocals
 Playboi Carti – vocals
 Fivio Foreign – vocals
 30 Roc – production 
 AyoAA – production
 Ojivolta – production
 David & Eli – co-production 
 Sloane – additional production 
 Irko – mastering, mixing
 Alejandro Rodriguez-Dawsøn – recording
 Drrique Rendeer – recording
 James Kelso – recording
 Josh Berg – recording
 Lorenzo Wolff – recording
 Mikalai Skrobat – recording
 Roark Bailey – recording
 Will Chason – recording
 Louis Bell – vocal editing
 Patrick Hundley – vocal editing

Charts

Weekly charts

Monthly charts

Year-end charts

Certifications

References

2021 songs
Kanye West songs
Fivio Foreign songs
Playboi Carti songs
Song recordings produced by Kanye West
Songs written by Cyhi the Prynce
Songs written by Fivio Foreign
Songs written by Kanye West
Songs written by Playboi Carti
Songs written by 30 Roc